"Unity makes strength" is a motto that has been used by various states and entities throughout history. It is used by Belgium, Bulgaria, Haiti, Malaysia and Georgia on their coats of arms and is the national motto of Belgium, Bolivia, Malaysia, Georgia and Bulgaria.

The motto was originally used by the Dutch Republic as "eendracht maakt macht". It was derived originally from a Greek phrase (ισχύς εν τη ενώσει literally meaning power lies in unity) attributed to Homer, dating to roughly 850 BC, that later appears similarly in the Latin phrase concordia res parvae crescunt ("small things flourish by concord"), used in the Bellum Iugurthinum of Roman Republican writer Sallust.

The similar moral of the Aesopic fable "The Old Man and his Sons" has been rendered in various related ways: "All power is weak unless united" (1668), "Unity makes strength, strife wastes" (1685), "Strength lies in union" (1867), "Strength is in unity" (1887), "Unity is strength" (title), "Union gives strength" (moral) (1894), "Union is strength" (1912), "In unity is strength" (1919); although older versions are more specific: "Brotherly love is the greatest good in life and often lifts the humble higher" (2nd century), "Just as concord supplies potency in human affairs, so a quarrelsome life deprives people of their strength" (16th century).

Origins

Ancient Greek
The Iliad 13:237 has  'even weak men have strength in unity'.

Latin

One Latin version is vis unita fortior 'force united is stronger'. It was the original state motto of New Hampshire.

Uses

Belgium

The motto was used by Belgium after its Revolution of 1830, initially only in its French form "". Only when Dutch was made equal in status to French did the Belgian state also take "" as its motto, sometimes with the variant "". In 1830, this unity was identified with the unification of Belgium's nine provinces, whose nine provincial coats of arms are represented on the national arms, and the new country's unification of its liberal progressives and Catholic conservatives. Indeed, it was launched in 1827–1828 by newspapers published in Liège, which allied liberals and Catholics in the unionism which brought about the revolution and which then dominated Belgian politics until the founding of the Liberal Party in 1846. Although the motto is often used in Belgicist or unitarist circles (as a call to Flemings and Walloons, natives of Brussels and German speakers, all to maintain Belgium's unity), this is a historical misinterpretation; the motto is a unionist – not a unitarist – slogan. Its German version is "".

Bulgaria

Following the Bulgarian unification and after Ferdinand of the House of Saxe-Coburg and Gotha took over the throne of the Principality of Bulgaria, the country adopted the motto - Unity makes strength. It was the country's motto until 1948. After the fall of the People's Republic of Bulgaria and the end of Communist rule in the 1990s, the parties debated what should be the country's new coat of arms, deciding on a modified version of its former royal coat of arms. However, the Bulgarian motto also represents the legendary last words of khan Kubrat, the founder of Old Great Bulgaria in 632 AD, and is likely rooted much earlier in Bulgarian symbolics than in other European states.

Canada
At the second national convention of Acadians in 1884, "L'union fait la force" was chosen as the national motto of Acadia and appeared in the coat of arms of Société nationale de l'Acadie in 1995.

Georgia
Dzala ertobashia ("strength is in unity") is the official motto of Georgia.

Haiti

One of the oldest uses of the term written in the French language, is known since 1807, on Haiti's national coat of arms bearing the motto, "L'union fait la force". Although, it should not be confused with the national motto of Haiti, which according to the Constitution of Haiti is "Liberty, Equality, Fraternity."

Malaysia
The coat of arms of the Federation of Malaya (present day Peninsular Malaysia) in used between 1948 and 1963 adopted a variation of the motto,  rendered "Unity is Strength" in English and "Bersekutu Bertambah Mutu" (literally "Federation Improves Quality") in Malay Jawi script. Following the formation of Malaysia in 1963, the English motto was replaced by "Bersekutu Bertambah Mutu" in Malay Latin (Rumi) script, while the Jawi motto remained unchanged.

Netherlands

This was the motto of the Dutch Republic (1581-1795) and during most of the Napoleonic times (1802–10). It continued to be used in the country until 1816 when it was replaced by the current Dutch motto Je maintiendrai. "Unity makes strength" was recorded for the first time in the Netherlands in the book Gemeene Duytsche Spreekwoorden ("Common Dutch Proverbs") in 1550, whilst the area was still within the Spanish Empire and under the rule of Charles V. After the Dutch gained independence, the new Dutch Republic took over the phrase as its motto and it appeared on several of its coins and coats of arms, usually in the original Latin form, Concordia res parvae crescunt (literally "together the small will grow"), referring to the new state's initially small territorial size. From the late 16th century onwards the start of the motto was frequently used on Dutch coinage, such as the Leicester-rijksdaalder in 1586.

The French occupied the Netherlands from 1795 to 1813, first as the Batavian Republic, then the Kingdom of Holland, then as an annexed part of France itself. Early in the occupation the national motto was changed to "" (Equality, Liberty, Fraternity), but from 1802 to 1810 'Unity makes strength' was re-introduced. It remained in use until the institution of the United Kingdom of the Netherlands when, in 1816, it switched to the House of Orange motto Je maintiendrai.

Today "Unity makes strength" ("Eendracht maakt macht") is still used by the Dutch football club PSV Eindhoven.

South Africa

On 17 January 1852, the United Kingdom, ruler of the Cape Colony, approved the independence of the South African Republic in the Sand River Convention. "Eendragt maakt magt" was the motto on the new state's shield, and in 1888 it decided it should only use high Dutch (not Afrikaans) as its only official language. Rendered in Latin, the motto of the Union of South Africa from 1910 until 1961 was "Ex Unitate Vires" ("Out of Unity, Strength").  After 1961, as the Republic of South Africa, the motto was rendered on coins in both Afrikaans (as "Eendrag maak mag") and in English (as "Unity is Strength"). The motto was changed in 2000 to "ǃke e: ǀxarra ǁke", which is "Unity in diversity" written in ǀXam.

United States
The motto of Brooklyn, a borough of New York City founded by Dutch settlers, is "Eendraght maeckt maght". It appears on Brooklyn's seal and flag. Additionally, it is the motto of The Collegiate School, the oldest primary and secondary school in the United States. The motto Eendragt maakt magt also appears on the badge of the police force of Holland, Michigan, combined with God zij met ons, but written as God Zy Met Ons ("God be with us").

Other uses
On 1 May 1865, the Association of Shareholders began fundraising for a private building for the society. This coincided with the fiftieth anniversary of the Battle of Waterloo, which was one reason the society took the motto of king William II of the Netherlands. In 1980, the building was demolished to make way for the Caland Line metro route. A section of its ornate art nouveau facade (with the club's name between glazed tiles and leaf patterns) was preserved and built into the nearby Voorschoterlaan station.

The name was also used as the business name of the tailors "Eendracht maakt macht", who in 1910 decided to rent a building on Oranjeboomstraat in Rotterdam, as a joint workshop-office to move their office out of their home. The fine dust from the finished goods caused many to suffer from emphysema and a larger workplace named "Eendracht maakt macht" was built.

The motto was also used by Helena Blavatsky in her editorials, in response to the internal feuding which often affected the Theosophical Society.

The motto of the fascist British government in the Doctor Who serial Inferno, mainly set in an alternate world, was "Unity is Strength," based on the slogan "Union is Strength" used by Oswald Mosley's contemporary Union Movement. Similarly, Norsefire, the fascist British government in the 2005 film V for Vendetta uses "Strength through Unity" (along with "Unity through Faith") as a prominent slogan.

In the 20th century, "L'Union Fait La Force" was the motto of and adorned emblems of the Union Saint-Jean-Baptiste d’Amérique, at one time the largest French Catholic fraternal organization in the United States.

The Latin form concordia res parvae crescunt is used by various institutions: the Ateneum in Helsinki, Finland; the former mortgage society in Riga, Latvia (now the Foreign Ministry).

See also

 Skilurus, a legendary Scythian king who taught the same moral by instructing his sons to break a bundle of arrows

References

External links

National mottos
National symbols of Haiti
National symbols of Bulgaria
National symbols of Belgium